Miller's Point may refer to:

 Miller Point, in Antarctica
 Millers Point, New South Wales
 Miller's Point, Western Cape